Parvis de Saint-Gilles/Sint-Gillis Voorplein is part of the Brussels Metro, situated in the Saint-Gilles commune of the Brussels capital region, Belgium.

Opened on 3 December 1993, the station forms part of a southerly extension to the north–south premetro line (formerly line 3), which originally linked the Brussels-North railway station and Brussels-South railway station. The underground station serves the 3, 4, 33 and 51 trams and there is a surface connection to the 48 bus route. The main entrance is from the church square (parvis, voorplein) of Saint-Gilles/Sint-Gillis for which it is named. The current church, which dominates the site, designed by Victor Besme and built in the 1860s, is eclectic in style. It replaced an earlier church, on which work commenced in 1595 but did not finish until 1765, which in turn had replaced a 13th-century building which was demolished in 1578 to strengthen the fortifications of Brussels.

The walls of the station are covered with blue tiles inscribed with the text of the Universal Declaration of Human Rights, in French and Dutch. This work, entitled Dyad, was undertaken by artist Françoise Schein.

References

External links 
 Map of station and surrounds (STIB/MIVB)
 Photographs
 Saint-Gilles/Sint-Gillis church history and description (Irismonument)

Brussels metro stations
Saint-Gilles, Belgium